A step outline (more commonly called a beat sheet) is a detailed telling of a story with the intention of turning the story into a screenplay for a motion picture. 

The step outline briefly details every scene of the screenplay's story, and often has indications for dialogue and character interactions. The scenes are often numbered for convenience.

It can also be an extremely useful tool for a writer working on a spec script.

References

Cinematic techniques
Film production
Screenwriting